The term Mullo may refer to:

 Mullo (vampire), a type of vampire in Roma folklore
 Mullo (god), in Celtic mythology
 5164 Mullo, an asteroid - see List of minor planets: 5001–6000

See also
 Mulo (disambiguation)